Carlos Valverde Madrid (born 5 March 1988 in Santiago de la Puebla, Province of Salamanca) is a Spanish footballer who plays for UP Plasencia as a left back.

References

External links

1988 births
Living people
Spanish footballers
Footballers from Castile and León
Association football defenders
Segunda División players
Segunda División B players
Tercera División players
UD Salamanca players
CD Badajoz players
CD Guijuelo footballers
CD Puertollano footballers
Zamora CF footballers
CD Guadalajara (Spain) footballers